Blue1 served the following destinations as of May 2014:

Terminated destinations
Belgium
Brussels – Brussels Airport
Croatia
Dubrovnik – Dubrovnik Airport
Pula – Pula Airport
Split – Split Airport
Germany
Berlin – Tegel Airport
Düsseldorf – Düsseldorf Airport
Hamburg – Hamburg Airport
Munich – Munich Airport
Estonia
Tallinn – Lennart Meri Tallinn Airport
Finland
Rovaniemi – Rovaniemi Airport [seasonal]
Kokkola – Kokkola-Pietarsaari Airport
Kuopio – Kuopio Airport
Lappeenranta – Lappeenranta Airport
Pori – Pori Airport
France
Biarritz – Biarritz - Anglet - Bayonne Airport [seasonal]
Nice – Nice Côte d'Azur Airport
Paris – Paris-Charles de Gaulle Airport
Greece
Athens – Athens International Airport
Hungary
Budapest – Budapest Ferenc Liszt International Airport
Ireland
Dublin – Dublin Airport
Italy
Bologna – Bologna Guglielmo Marconi Airport
Rome – Leonardo da Vinci-Fiumicino Airport [seasonal]
Netherlands
Amsterdam – Amsterdam Airport
Norway
Oslo – Oslo Airport, Gardermoen
Spain
Barcelona – Barcelona El Prat Airport [Seasonal]
Madrid – Madrid-Barajas Airport
Sweden
Gothenburg – Göteborg Landvetter Airport
Östersund – Åre Östersund Airport
United Kingdom
Edinburgh – Edinburgh Airport
London – London Heathrow Airport
Switzerland
Zürich – Zürich Airport

References

Blue1
SAS Group destinations